Christian Reiher (born 19 April 1984 in Starnberg) is a German mathematician. He is the fifth most successful participant in the history of the International Mathematical Olympiad, having won four gold medals in the years 2000 to 2003 and a bronze medal in 1999.

Just after finishing his Abitur, he proved Kemnitz's conjecture, an important problem in the theory of zero-sums. He went on to earn his Diplom in mathematics from the Ludwig Maximilian University of Munich.

Selected publications
.

External links

1984 births
Living people
People from Starnberg
21st-century German mathematicians
Ludwig Maximilian University of Munich alumni
University of Rostock alumni
International Mathematical Olympiad participants